Nganasan may refer to:

Nganasan people, an indigenous people of the Russian Far North
Nganasan language

See also
N. Ganesan (1932–2015), chairman of the Football Association of Singapore

Language and nationality disambiguation pages